Three steamships of the Ellerman & Papyanni Line were named Flaminian:

, 2,131 GRT, sold 1901
, 3,439 GRT, shelled and sunk in 1915
, 3,227 GRT, scrapped 1950

Ship names